Donald Gary Borgeson (born May 20, 1945) is a Canadian retired professional ice hockey forward. He would play 145 games in the World Hockey Association with the New England Whalers and Phoenix Roadrunners.

References

External links

1945 births
Living people
Canadian ice hockey forwards
Denver Spurs (WHA) players
Denver Spurs (WHL) players
Ice hockey people from Saskatchewan
New England Whalers players
Ottawa Civics players
Sportspeople from North Battleford
Phoenix Roadrunners (PHL) players
Phoenix Roadrunners (WHA) players
Providence Reds players
Western International Hockey League players
Canadian expatriate ice hockey players in the United States